Nyeleti Brooke Mondlane (born January 17, 1962) is a politician in Mozambique. She is the daughter of FRELIMO President Eduardo Mondlane and American-born activist Janet Mondlane.

Mondlane was a member of the Assembly of the Republic from 1994 to 2014. Mondlane was the vice-minister for foreign affairs. Mondlane became the Minister of Gender, Children and Social Welfare in 2020.

References

Living people
1962 births
Mozambican politicians
Members of the Assembly of the Republic (Mozambique)
Place of birth missing (living people)
Mozambican people of American descent